Nathanael "Simi" Sasagi (born 24 April 2001) is a New Zealand professional rugby league footballer who plays as a  and  for the Newcastle Knights in the NRL.

Background
Sasagi was born in Auckland, New Zealand. He is of Samoan descent.

He played his junior rugby league for the Ellerslie Eagles, before being signed by the Newcastle Knights.

Playing career

Early years
Sasagi started his career at the Knights playing with their S. G. Ball Cup team in 2018, before re-signing with the club on a contract until the end of 2020, with an option for a further two seasons after that. In 2019 and 2020, he trained with the first-grade squad as a development player, but only played two games for the Knights' Jersey Flegg Cup side in that time after being hampered by injury. He was named in the Junior Kiwis squad in September 2019.

2021
In 2021, Sasagi was promoted to the top 30 squad and spent his time playing with the NSW Cup side. He made his NRL debut for Newcastle against North Queensland in round 11 of the 2021 NRL season, playing in the s as Newcastle were defeated 20–36.

2022
Sasagi played 14 games for Newcastle in the 2022 NRL season which saw the club missing the finals finishing 14th on the table.

References

External links
Newcastle Knights profile

2001 births
Living people
New Zealand sportspeople of Samoan descent
New Zealand rugby league players
Newcastle Knights players
Junior Kiwis players
Rugby league five-eighths
Rugby league centres
Rugby league players from Auckland